HK Levice is a professional Slovak ice hockey club based in Levice, Slovakia. They currently play in the Slovak 1. Liga. The team was established in 1987.

History
The first year of the 1987/1988 season, VTJ Levice played in a regional competition that team won league. Since the 1988/1989 competition, the cooperative has played in II. SNHL, which regularly fought until 1993 for a procedure until I. SNHL.

Honours

Domestic

Slovak 2. Liga
  Winners (1): 2018–19

References

External links
Official website 

Ice hockey teams in Slovakia
Ice hockey clubs established in 1987